Waarom heeft niemand mij verteld dat het zo erg zou worden in Afghanistan (English: Why Didn't Anybody Tell Me It Would Become This Bad in Afghanistan) is the first full-length feature film shot with a mobile phone. The films is about a Dutch Afghan War veteran who recalls his experiences during the war and tells how he came to cope with them.

The film premiered at major film festivals: the International Film Festival Rotterdam 2007 (WP), Tribeca Film Festival 2007 (IP), the San Francisco International Film Festival 2007, Pesaro 2007, and many others.

Directed by Cyrus Frisch and mostly filmed in the Netherlands.

Sources 
The phoney film-maker Chris Campion, The Observer, 2007-02-04
Why Didn't Anybody Tell Me It Would Become This Bad in Afghanistan Sean Uyehara, San Francisco Film Society, accessed 2007-12-04
SFIFF Film Capsules Gregg Rickman, SF Weekly, 2007-04-25
Why didn't anybody tell me it would become this bad in Afghanistan 2007 Tribeca Film Guide, Tribeca Enterprises, LLC, accessed 2007-12-04
Rutger Hauer na 28 jaar weer in Nederlandse speelfilm nieuws, cinema.nl, 2007-11-05
Cyrus Frisch Professional search, 2007 International Film Festival Rotterdam, accessed 2007-12-04
Why Didn't Anybody Tell Me It Would Become This Bad in Afghanistan (2007) Internet Movie Database Inc. (IMDb), accessed 2007-12-04

2007 films
Dutch independent films
Mobile phone films
2000s Dutch-language films